Wrocław Brochów railway station is a station in the osiedle of Brochów in Wrocław, Poland. The railway station was built in 1896 due to the growing importance of Brochów's railway yard, being one of the largest in the German Empire, found on the Wrocław – Oława line completed in 1842, the first phase of the Upper Silesian Railway.

Nowadays, only regional trains, operated by Przewozy Regionalne and Koleje Dolnośląskie on lines Wrocław Główny – Opole and Wrocław Wojnów – Jelcz Laskowice stop at the station. Nearby the passenger station is one of the largest railway cargo hubs in Poland – Wrocław Brochów Towarowy.

In December 2011, the station building's restoration began. The total cost of which was about 1,8 million Polish złotys (including adaptation for disabled people).

Connections 
132 Bytom - Wrocław Główny
277 Opole Groszowice - Wrocław Brochów
349 Święta Katarzyna - Wrocław Kuźniki
764 Siechnice - Wrocław Brochów

Train Services

The station is served by the following service(s):

Regional services (PR) Wrocław Główny - Oława - Brzeg
Regional services (PR) Wrocław Główny - Oława - Brzeg - Nysa
Regional service (PR) Wrocław - Oława - Brzeg - Nysa - Kędzierzyn-Koźle
Regional services (PR) Wrocław Główny - Oława - Brzeg - Opole Główne
Regional service (PR) Wrocław - Oława - Brzeg - Opole Główne - Kędzierzyn-Koźle
Regional service (PR) Wrocław - Oława - Brzeg - Opole Główne - Kędzierzyn-Koźle - Racibórz
Regional service (PR) Wrocław - Oława - Brzeg - Opole Główne - Gliwice
Regional services (PR) Wrocław Główny - Jelcz-Laskowice

References 

Wrocław County
Brochów
Railway stations in Poland opened in 1896